Sir Dagonet  (also known as Daguenet, Daguenes, Daguenez, Danguenes, and other spellings) is a Knight of the Round Table in Arthurian legend. His depictions and characterisations variously portray a foolish and cowardly knight, a violently deranged madman, to the now-iconic image of King Arthur's beloved court jester.

Medieval literature
His first appearance is in the early 13th-century Vulgate Cycle's section Prose Lancelot. Known as Daguenet the Fool/the Coward or Danguenes the Craven of Carlion (Caerleon), a hapless knight who people constantly mock. He "captures" (and rescues) the hero Lancelot by finding and leading a horse carrying the unconscious Lancelot to Queen Guinevere. Later, during the False Guinevere's reign in another work, Les Prophéties de Merlin, Dagonet, loyal to Arthur and still known as the fool, takes on the administration of the royal court. He bankrupts the household, killing the treasurer Fole for reproving him, yet ultimately proves to be competent enough to finance the mercenaries who help Galeholt repel a Saxon invasion, while successfully avoiding the vengeance of Fole's kinsmen.

His alternative portrayal in a series of short episodes within the Guiron le Courtois section of Palamedes takes on a tragic tone. There he is a feared and unpredictable madman whose backstory is revealed as formerly one of the best knights of Arthur who went insane when his newly-married love was abducted by his own friend, Helior of the Thorn, whom Dagonet then tracked down and killed.

One of his two appearances in the different versions of the Prose Tristan is the first in which he is depicted as Arthur's official fool. It characterised him as a hateful and mad commoner who was given knightly status as a joke. He challenges the young Cote Mal Taillee (Brunor) to a joust and quickly loses. In the second version, Tristan humiliates "Sir Daguenet the Fool" publicly by dunking him into a well, and then uses Dagonet's own sword to maim one of Dagonet's angry squires when protecting a group of shepherds who laughed at the scene.

In a markedly more positive (and best known today) characterization by Thomas Malory in his seminal Le Morte d'Arthur, Dagonet is King Arthur's court fool who has been knighted as an award for his loyalty and comedic talents. The Knights of the Round Table use Dagonet to play practical jokes on their rivals or their enemies, at the same time protecting him from harm. In a rewrite of a scene from the Prose Tristan, Kay arranges for Brunor to joust with Dagonet at his first tournament in order to deprive him of the honour of defeating a true knight. On another occasion, Arthur's men point out Dagonet, dressed in Mordred's armor, to King Mark and tell him he is Lancelot; the cowardly monarch flees screaming into the forest, chased by Dagonet.

Later media
In Shakespeare's Henry IV, Part 2, Master Shallow boasts of portraying Sir Dagonet in "Arthur's show". This identifies the character as a buffoon.
In Tennyson's 19th-century poetry cycle Idylls of the King, "Sir" Dagonet appears in "The Last Tournament". The jester is the only one on the court who could foresee the coming doom of the kingdom. He mocks the faithless knights who have broken their vows, and declares that although he and Arthur could hear the music of God's plan, they cannot.
In Howard Pyle's 1905 novel The Story of the Champions of the Round Table, Sir Dagonet, called Arthur's fool, is dim-witted yet noted for his knightly deeds. He bears the heraldic device of a cockerel's head.
In the 1930s Grove Play Birds of Rhiannon by Waldemar Young, instead of participating in the Battle of Camlann he is instead sent on a quest along with Taliesin and other court bards by Merlin to go "beyond the furthest hill" to find their lost childhood dreams. They had been traveling for 28 days since but then after leaving the forest they came upon a hill where they meet a shepherd boy who lost his sheep when he got distracted by one of Rhiannon's birds. Then they were interrupted by Sir Kay who tells them that King Arthur wants them to return (not mentioning that Arthur had already died in Camlann). While the others gave up the quest in order to return, Sir Dagonet refused. He and Kay fought, but in the end Kay was victorious and ran his sword through Dagonet, laughing as he left Dagonet to die.
In the 2004 film King Arthur, the character, portrayed by Ray Stevenson, is depicted as a brave, self-sacrificing warrior whose actions save the rest of Arthur's knights.
Jeremy Whitley wrote the 2012 comic book miniseries The Order of Dagonet with art by Jason Strutz.

See also
Dinadan

References

External links
Dagonet at The Camelot Project

Arthurian characters
Fictional characters with neurological or psychological disorders
Fictional jesters
Fictional Welsh people
Knights of the Round Table